The Association for the Study of American Indian Literatures (ASAIL) is a professional academic organization. It was founded in 1971  to promote the study, criticism, and research of American Indian literary traditions, both written and oral. Its journal, Studies in American Indian Literatures, has been the primary journal for the study of North American indigenous literature for over thirty years.

Conferences
ASAIL is affiliated with the Modern Language Association (MLA). ASAIL sponsors panels at several conferences:

The Native American Literature Symposium,
The American Literature Association (ALA) conference,
The Society for the Study of American Women Writers (SSAWW) conference.

Publications
ASAIL publishes the quarterly journal Studies in American Indian Literatures. It has been the primary journal for the study of North American indigenous literature for over thirty years.

References

External links

Academic organizations based in the United States
Arts organizations established in 1971
Native American arts organizations
Native American literature
Professional associations based in the United States